Near Island is an island that comprises part of the city of Kodiak, Alaska, United States. It lies across the Near Island Channel just south of downtown Kodiak. The island is the site of St. Herman Harbor, the newer of Kodiak's two marinas.  Near island has a land area of 1.117 km2 (276.05 acres) and a resident population of six people as of the 2000 census. It is connected to downtown Kodiak by the Near Island Bridge on Dog Bay Road.

References

Islands of the Kodiak Archipelago
Islands of Alaska